The  1906 Washington University football team represented Washington University in St. Louis as an independent during the 1906 college football season. Led by first-year head coach J. Merrill Blanchard, the team compiled a record of 2–2–2. Frank S. Lucky was elected team captain.

Schedule

References

Washington University
Washington University Bears football seasons
Washington University football